Demetrio Galán Bergua (1894–1970) was a Spanish physician, humanist and journalist.

Early career
He practiced medicine in rural Mendigorría (Navarra), Sotés (La Rioja), Biescas, Sallent de Gallego (Huesca ) and Illueca (Zaragoza) before he went to Madrid, where he received his doctorate in 1925.

1894 births
1970 deaths
People from Zaragoza
Spanish humanists
20th-century Spanish journalists